A religious community is a community where the members practice the religion. It may also be a(n):

 ashram
 convent
 Intentional community
 monastery
 religious congregation
 Religious order
 Religious institute
 Shaker community